Steve Bates (born 4 March 1963) is a rugby coach and retired from former rugby union player. He played at scrum-half for London Wasps and was capped once for the England national rugby union team. He twice worked as a coach at Newcastle Falcons, 1995–2003 and 2007–2010.

Early life
Steven Michael Bates was born on 4 March 1963 in Merthyr Tydfil, Wales. During his days as a player, in the amateur era, Bates was a schoolteacher at Radley College and Lord Wandsworth College in Hampshire.

Rugby career
He played at scrum-half for London Wasps, where he formed a successful partnership with fly-half Rob Andrew. He was capped once for England, against  in Bucharest in 1989, and was on England's tour of South Africa in 1994.

In 1995, when Andrew left Wasps to become Director of Rugby at Newcastle Falcons, Bates followed him, becoming the Falcons' head coach.  Bates was instrumental in attracting the fly-half Jonny Wilkinson to Newcastle in the summer of 1997, with Wilkinson having previously been a pupil at Lord Wandsworth College where Bates taught. Under Bates, Newcastle were promoted to the Premiership at the end of the 1996–97 season and went on to top the league at the first attempt, in 1997–98; they reached the final of the Tetley's Bitter Cup in 1999 and won the trophy (by then known as the Powergen Cup in 2001. Bates left Newcastle in March 2003

In 2004 Bates was appointed as head coach of Border Reivers, taking over from New Zealander Tony Gilbert, who was returning home.

When the Scottish Rugby Union announced that Border Reivers were to be disbanded at the end of the 2006–07 season, Bates was headhunted by Newcastle Falcons to become their Coaching and Technical Director and rejoined the club in June 2007. Bates was sacked by the Falcons in May 2010.

In January 2008, the Rugby Football Union announced the appointment of Bates as head coach of England Saxons on a part-time basis.

In 2011 Bates was appointed the director of sport at Fettes College in Edinburgh. Bates left to become head coach of England Rugby Union Under 20s in March 2017.

References

External links
 profile at Fettes College
 profile at Wasps

1963 births
Living people
England international rugby union players
English rugby union players
Rugby union players from Merthyr Tydfil
Rugby union scrum-halves
Welsh rugby union players